Kostenevo is a rural locality (a village) in Mstyora Urban Settlement, Vyaznikovsky District, Vladimir Oblast, Russia. The population was 8 as of 2010.

Geography 
Kostenevo is located 17 km northwest of Vyazniki (the district's administrative centre) by road. Yandovy is the nearest rural locality.

References 

Rural localities in Vyaznikovsky District